Alain Vigneault (born May 14, 1961) is a Canadian professional ice hockey coach. Vigneault has previously coached the Montreal Canadiens, Vancouver Canucks, New York Rangers and the Philadelphia Flyers in the NHL, as well as in the Quebec Major Junior Hockey League (QMJHL). During his career with the Canucks, he won the Jack Adams Award as the NHL's top coach of the year in 2006–07 and became the team's record holder for wins as a coach. Under Vigneault, Vancouver won back-to-back Presidents' Trophies (2010–11 and 2011–12) and made one Stanley Cup Finals appearance (2011). In his first season with New York, he led the Rangers to their first Stanley Cup Finals appearance (2014) in 20 years.

Prior to his coaching career, Vigneault played professionally as a defenceman for six seasons in the NHL, Central Hockey League and American Hockey League (AHL). In the NHL, he played 42 games over two seasons, 1981–82 and 1982–83, for the St. Louis Blues.

Playing career
As a youth, Vigneault played in the 1973 and 1974 Quebec International Pee-Wee Hockey Tournaments with a minor ice hockey team from Hull, Quebec, and then a team from East Ottawa.

Vigneault played as a defenceman in the QMJHL for four seasons, beginning in 1977–78 with the Hull Olympiques. He recorded 11 goals and 46 points over 59 games as a rookie, before improving to 13 goals and 54 points over 72 games to rank fifth in team scoring the following season. In his third QMJHL season, Vigneault was traded from Hull to the Trois Rivieres Draveurs. Between the two teams, he accumulated a junior career-high 64 points (11 goals and 53 assists) over 63 games. The following season, his fourth and final in the QMJHL, he tallied seven goals and 62 points over 67 games, before adding four goals and ten points in 19 playoff games. His efforts helped the Draveurs to the QMJHL Finals, where they were defeated four-games-to-one by the Cornwall Royals.

Following his QMJHL career, Vigneault was selected in the eighth round, 167th overall, by the St. Louis Blues in the 1981 NHL Entry Draft. He joined the Blues organization during the 1981-82 season where he appeared in 14 games for the club; tallying 1 goal and 2 assists. The remainder of his rookie season was spent in the minor league with the Blues' Central Hockey League (CHL) affiliate, the Salt Lake Golden Eagles. Vigneault was called up to the Blues again the following season where he recorded a goal and three assists in 28 regular season appearances, as well as one assist in four in the playoffs games, while splitting time with the Eagles. The 1983 playoffs were Vigneault's final appearances as a player in the NHL, as he finished his career the following season splitting time between the Maine Mariners of the AHL and the Montana Magic in the CHL.

Coaching career

QMJHL and Ottawa Senators
Vigneault began his coaching career at the age of 25 in 1986–87, one season after his retirement as a player. He began in the QMJHL, coaching one season for the Trois-Rivières Draveurs and five for the Hull Olympiques, the same two teams he played junior hockey for. He coached the Olympiques to personal QMJHL regular season bests in 1987–88 with a 43–23–4 record and a playoff championship.

In the 1992–93 season, Vigneault got his first break in the National Hockey League (NHL) as an assistant coach with the expansion Ottawa Senators. After three-and-a-half years in that position, the Senators' assistant coaches were dismissed during the 1995–96 season and Vigneault returned to the QMJHL to coach the Beauport Harfangs. He led the team to his second QMJHL Finals appearance, where they were defeated by the Granby Prédateurs.

Montreal Canadiens
After a full season with the Harfangs in 1996–97, Vigneault began his second stint in the NHL and his first as a head coach, with the Montreal Canadiens. Becoming the 20th coach in the history of the Original Six team, he replaced Mario Tremblay. After winning the Stanley Cup in 1993, the team had not advanced past the first round of the playoffs in the four years since. In his first season with the Canadiens, he coached the team to a regular season record of 37 wins, 32 losses and 13 ties to rank fourth in the Northeast Division. They then advanced to the second round with a four-games-to-two series victory over the Pittsburgh Penguins, before being swept in four games by the Buffalo Sabres. The following season, however, the Canadiens failed to make the playoffs with a 32–39–11 record.

During his third season with the Canadiens in 1999–2000, he returned to above-.500, despite numerous long-term injuries to key players, just narrowly missing a post-season berth. For his efforts, despite his team failing to make the playoffs for a second-straight year, he was nominated for the Jack Adams Award as the League's coach of the year, ultimately losing the award to Joel Quenneville of the St. Louis Blues. After the Canadiens continued to struggle the following season, Vigneault was fired midway through the campaign and replaced by Michel Therrien.

Following his tenure with the Canadiens, he spent two-and-a-half years inactive as a coach. In 2003–04, he was hired to coach the Prince Edward Island Rocket. That season, he coached them to a 40–19–5 record and a second-round appearance in the playoff.

Vancouver Canucks
After another season with the Rocket, in which the team finished out of the playoffs, Vigneault was hired by the Vancouver Canucks organization to coach their minor-league affiliate, the Manitoba Moose, of the American Hockey League (AHL). Following a successful season in Manitoba, in which the Moose earned 100 points and reached the second round of the playoffs, he was chosen to replace Marc Crawford as the Canucks' head coach ahead of the 2006–07 season. The Canucks had failed to qualify for the playoffs in Crawford's last season with the club and were seen to have underperformed after being considered Stanley Cup contenders after the 2004–05 NHL lockout. In replacing Crawford, who was the Canucks' record holder for all-time wins by a coach, Vigneault became the 16th coach in team history. While Crawford was known for coaching the team under an offence-first mentality, Vigneault had a defensive-minded reputation at the time of his hiring. In addition to letting Crawford go, General Manager Dave Nonis retooled the team considerably. Key offensive players Ed Jovanovski and Todd Bertuzzi departed as stay-at-home defenceman Willie Mitchell and star goaltender Roberto Luongo were brought in.

In his first season as head coach of the Canucks, Vigneault coached them to a franchise record 49 wins, eclipsing the 46-win season recorded under Pat Quinn in 1992–93. The team won the regular season Northwest Division title before being eliminated in the second round of the playoffs by the Anaheim Ducks. As a result, he received his second Jack Adams Award nomination and beat out Lindy Ruff of the Buffalo Sabres and Michel Therrien of the Pittsburgh Penguins in voting to win the coach of the year on June 14, 2007. The following season, however, the Canucks failed to qualify for the playoffs and GM Dave Nonis was fired. After Nonis' successor, Mike Gillis, was brought in, it was speculated whether or not he would retain Vigneault. After several meetings with Gillis, Vigneault was re-signed to a one-year contract extension to keep him in Vancouver to the 2009–10 season. Vigneault's assistant coaches Barry Smith and Mike Kelly, inherited from Crawford's coaching staff, were both fired.

With the departure of captain Markus Näslund in the 2008 off-season, Vigneault and team management controversially selected Roberto Luongo as the Canucks' new captain, despite NHL rules forbidding goaltenders to be chosen for the position. Luongo became the first goaltender to captain an NHL team in 60 years, though he was not permitted to wear the captain's "C" on his jersey, nor was he permitted to perform the traditional on-ice duties of a captain in the NHL (such as speaking to the referees on behalf of the coach). Under new leadership and management, Vigneault and the Canucks returned to the post-season and won their second Northwest Division title in three years. They were once again defeated in the second round, however; this time by the Chicago Blackhawks.

About to enter the final year of his contract in 2009–10, Vigneault was signed to a three-year extension in September 2009. The Canucks matched their franchise-best 49 wins from Vigneault's first season and repeated as Northwest Division champions. Though for a second consecutive year, they were eliminated by the Blackhawks in the second round.

After finishing near the top of their conference for the majority of Vigneault's tenure with the team up to the 2009–10 season, the Canucks won their first-ever Presidents' Trophy as the league's best regular season team after a franchise year of 54 wins and 117 points. They advanced to the Stanley Cup Finals for the first time since 1994, but lost the championship in seven games to the Boston Bruins. Vigneault earned his third nomination for the Jack Adams Award in 2011, but lost to Dan Bylsma of the Pittsburgh Penguins. The following year, the Canucks repeated as Presidents' Trophy champions. During the season, Vigneault became the most winning coach in Canucks' history with his 247th victory with the team, a 3–0 shutout against the Colorado Avalanche on November 23, 2011. At 427 games, it took him 97 fewer contests than his predecessor, Crawford, to set the mark. Though the league's best regular season team once more in 2011–12, the Canucks were eliminated from the 2012 Stanley Cup playoffs in the first round; losing in five games to the eventual champion, the eighth-seeded Los Angeles Kings.

During the 2013 playoffs, the Canucks were swept in the first round by the San Jose Sharks. Vigneault was fired by the Canucks on May 22, 2013.

New York Rangers
On June 21, 2013, the New York Rangers hired Vigneault to be their 34th head coach, replacing John Tortorella, who coincidentally was hired as Vigneault's replacement in Vancouver. He signed a five-year, $10 million contract.

Vigneault's Rangers initially struggled in the first half of the 2013–14 campaign, but finished very strong. The Rangers finished second in the Metropolitan Division, qualifying for the post-season and making it to the team's first Stanley Cup Finals since they defeated the Vancouver Canucks in the 1993–94 season. The team, however, lost to the Los Angeles Kings in five games in the Stanley Cup Final.

In 2014–15, Vigneault's second season with the team, the Rangers set a franchise record with 113 points in the regular season, winning the NHL's Presidents' Trophy for the first time since the 1993-94 season. In the first round, the Rangers knocked out the Pittsburgh Penguins in five games, winning the fifth and clinching game on an overtime winner from Carl Hagelin. It was the earliest Sidney Crosby and the Penguins had been eliminated from the playoffs since his sophomore season in 2006–07. In the semi-finals the Rangers found themselves facing a familiar foe in Alexander Ovechkin and the Washington Capitals, the fifth meeting between the two franchises since 2009 (each team had won two). The Rangers fell behind 3-1 in the series and were down 1-0 in game five, a mere 101 seconds from elimination, before Chris Kreider broke the shutout. In overtime team captain Ryan McDonagh scored the game winner to send the series back to Washington. In game six Kreider once again sparked the team, scoring in the first minute and final second of the first period as the Rangers withstood a late rally by the Capitals to win 4–3 and force a game 7 at Madison Square Garden. Anticipation was extremely high for this game as prices for a seat reached record prices. Ovechkin opened the scoring on a high glove wrister in the first period but Rangers' rookie Kevin Hayes evened the score on the power play. In the first Game 7 overtime at Madison Square Garden since the 1994 Stanley Cup Finals, Derek Stepan scored the game-winning goal, sending the Rangers to their third conference finals in four years, where they would eventually be eliminated by the Tampa Bay Lightning.

On April 7, 2018, the Rangers fired Vigneault after the team finished at 34-39-9 and missed the playoffs for the first time since 2010.

Philadelphia Flyers
On April 15, 2019, the Philadelphia Flyers hired Vigneault as their head coach. In his first season with the Flyers, he led the club to a 41–21–7 record and a playoff appearance, before the season was paused as a result of the COVID-19 pandemic. In his first season with the Flyers, Vigneault was a finalist for the Jack Adams Award, coming in second in final voting to the Boston Bruins' Bruce Cassidy.

On February 28, 2021, Vigneault won his 700th career game as a head coach, becoming only the ninth coach in NHL history to reach the milestone. On December 6, the Flyers fired Vigneault following a 7–1 loss to the Tampa Bay Lightning. The loss extended their losing streak to 8 games amidst falling to an 8-10-4 record to begin the 2021-2022 season after missing the playoffs in the previous season.

Career statistics

Regular season and playoffs

NHL coaching record

Awards and accomplishments
 Brian Kilrea Coach of the Year Award (QMJHL) – 1988
 Jack Adams Award winner (NHL coach of the year) – 2007
 Named a co-coach for the 58th National Hockey League All-Star Game – 2011
 Vancouver Canucks all-time winningest coach - 313

See also
 List of NHL head coaches

References

External links
 

1961 births
Living people
Beauport Harfangs coaches
Canada men's national ice hockey team coaches
Canadian expatriate ice hockey players in the United States
Canadian ice hockey coaches
Canadian ice hockey defencemen
French Quebecers
Hull Olympiques coaches
Hull Olympiques players
Ice hockey people from Quebec City
Jack Adams Award winners
Maine Mariners players
Manitoba Moose coaches
Montana Magic players
Montreal Canadiens coaches
New York Rangers coaches
Ottawa Senators coaches
P.E.I. Rocket coaches
Philadelphia Flyers coaches
Salt Lake Golden Eagles (CHL) players
Ice hockey people from Gatineau
St. Louis Blues draft picks
St. Louis Blues players
Trois-Rivières Draveurs coaches
Trois-Rivières Draveurs players
Vancouver Canucks coaches